Georgia Ann Guy (born 26 November 1993) is a New Zealand former cricketer who played as a right-arm off break bowler. She appeared in 7 One Day Internationals and 6 Twenty20 Internationals for New Zealand between 2014 and 2015. She played domestic cricket for Auckland.

References

External links

1993 births
Living people
Cricketers from Auckland
New Zealand women cricketers
New Zealand women One Day International cricketers
New Zealand women Twenty20 International cricketers
Auckland Hearts cricketers